Edward Synge may refer to: 

 Edward Synge (bishop of Cork, Cloyne and Ross) (died 1678), previously Bishop of Limerick, Ardfert and Aghadoe
 Edward Synge (archbishop of Tuam) (1659–1741), previously Bishop of Raphoe
 Edward Synge (bishop of Elphin) (1691–1762), previously Bishop of Clonfert & Kilmacduagh, Bishop of Cloyne, and Bishop of Ferns & Leighlin
 Edward Hutchinson Synge (1890–1957), inventor of the near-field optical microscope
 Edward Synge (priest) (1726–1792), Anglican priest in Ireland